The Tarban Creek Bridge is a prestressed concrete arch bridge that carries the Burns Bay Road across the Tarban Creek, located west of the Sydney central business district in New South Wales, Australia. The bridge is situated between the Gladesville Bridge and the Fig Tree Bridge, being immediately to the north of Gladesville Bridge.  The bridge connects the suburbs of Hunters Hill and Huntleys Point. In addition to the four-lane carriage, the bridge carries a grade-separated shared pedestrian footpath and cycleway.

Description

Opened in December 1965, the Tarban Creek Bridge formed a "missing link" between the existing Gladesville and Fig Tree Bridges.  Traffic between the old Fig Tree and Gladesville Bridges previously had to negotiate the streets of Hunters Hill to cross the creek further upstream. The three new bridges were built to carry a North Western Expressway, which never came to fruition.

From 2006, the Tarban Creek Bridge formed part of the Seven Bridges Walk, a free community event that promotes walking as a way of staying fit and active, and consisted of a circuit that crossed seven of Sydney's bridges, including the Sydney Harbour, Pyrmont, Anzac, Iron Cove, Gladesville, and Fig Tree bridges.

The rowing boathouses of the rowing club of Sydney Girls High School, the University of New South Wales, and St Joseph's College are located on the shore of the Tarban Creek.

See also

 List of bridges in Sydney

References

External links

Deck arch bridges
Bridges in Sydney
Bridges completed in 1965
1965 establishments in Australia
Municipality of Hunter's Hill
Road bridges in New South Wales
Arch bridges in Australia
Concrete bridges in Australia